Hubbard is a city in Hardin County, Iowa, United States. The population was 860 at the time of the 2020 census.

History
Hubbard was settled as a community in the year 1880, following construction of the railroad through the territory. It was named for Judge Nathaniel M. Hubbard, railroad attorney.

Hubbard was incorporated on November 1, 1881.

Geography
Hubbard is located at  (42.305009, -93.300708).

Demographics

2010 census
At the 2010 census there were 845 people, 356 households and 219 families living in the city. The racial make-up was 97.6% White, 0.1% African American, 0.1% Native American, 0.4% Asian, 1.1% from other races and 0.7% from two or more races. Hispanic or Latino of any race were 2.8% of the population.

There were 356 households, of which 24.7% had children under the age of 18 living with them, 53.9% were married couples living together, 6.2% had a female householder with no husband present, 1.4% had a male householder with no wife present, and 38.5% were non-families. 32.9% of all households were made up of individuals, and 16.3% had someone living alone who was 65 years of age or older. The average household size was 2.21 and the average family size was 2.80.

The median age was 47.8 years. 21.7% of residents were under the age of 18; 5.1% were between the ages of 18 and 24; 19.6% were from 25 to 44; 25.7% were from 45 to 64; and 27.8% were 65 years of age or older. The gender makeup of the city was 45.1% male and 54.9% female.

2000 census
At the 2000 census, there were 885 people, 374 households and 253 families living in the city. The racial make-up was 99.32% White, 0.11% Asian, 0.34% from other races and 0.23% from two or more races. Hispanic or Latino of any race were 0.45% of the population.

There were 374 households, of which 25.7% had children under the age of 18 living with them, 60.2% were married couples living together, 4.8% had a female householder with no husband present and 32.1% were non-families. 29.7% of all households were made up of individuals, and 20.6% had someone living alone who was 65 years of age or older. The average household size was 2.24 and the average family size was 2.76.

20.7% were under the age of 18, 5.9% from 18 to 24, 22.6% from 25 to 44, 16.8% from 45 to 64, and 34.0% were 65 years of age or older. The median age was 46 years. For every 100 females, there were 86.7 males. For every 100 females age 18 and over, there were 83.3 males.

The median household income was $35,089 and the median family income was $41,563. Males had a median income of $31,157 and females $22,417. The per capita income was $21,805. About 1.9% of families and 4.8% of the population were below the poverty line, including 6.2% of those under age 18 and 4.5% of those age 65 or over.

Education
Hubbard–Radcliffe Community School District is the area school district. The district was formed on July 1, 1993, with the merger of the Hubbard and Radcliffe school districts. In 2019, it had a grade-sharing arrangement with Eldora–New Providence Community School District and operates as "South Hardin Schools".

Kindergarten to fifth grade students from Hubbard attend Hubbard–Radcliffe Elementary School in Radcliffe, while sixth to eighth grades attend South Hardin Middle School in Hubbard. Ninth to twelve grades attend South Hardin High School in Eldora, the county seat of Hardin County.

References

External links
Town website
City-Data.com

Cities in Iowa
Cities in Hardin County, Iowa
1881 establishments in Iowa